Homunculus is an extinct genus of New World monkey that lived in Argentina during the Miocene. Two species are known: Homunculus patagonicus and Homunculus vizcainoi, which are known from material found in the Santa Cruz Formation in Argentina.

H. patagonicus was a robustly built, quadrupedal primate, with body mass estimates varying between  based on different techniques.

Some authors consider Killikaike blakei to be a junior synonym for H. patagonicus, but others consider the species distinct.

While some studies have regarded Homunculus as a crown group platyrhine and a member of the family Pitheciidae, other studies have regarded it as a stem-group platyrhine outside any modern group, which is supported by the morphology of its nasal turbinates, which are dissimilar to those of crown-group platyrhines.

References

Miocene mammals of South America
Miocene primates of South America
Prehistoric mammals of South America
Neogene Argentina
Fossils of Argentina
Fossil taxa described in 1891
Prehistoric monkeys
Mayoan
Laventan
Colloncuran
Friasian
Santacrucian
Taxa named by Florentino Ameghino
Golfo San Jorge Basin
Sarmiento Formation
Austral or Magallanes Basin
Santa Cruz Formation